KK Women's and Children's Hospital (abbreviation: KKH) is the largest public hospital specialising in healthcare for women and children in Singapore, located at 100 Bukit Timah Road.

From its humble beginnings as a small general hospital in 1858 to a 30-bed maternity hospital in 1924, KKH has grown into an 830-bed hospital providing obstetric and gynaecology, neonatology and paediatric services.

Often referred to as "KK" amongst locals, it is the birthplace of a sizeable proportion of Singaporeans, delivering over half of total newborns in the country as early as 1938.

History
The hospital's name comes from the Malay term for "buffalo shed" (kandang = shed / pen + kerbau = buffalo), reflecting the area's past link with buffalo rearing.

While the hospital started as one catering to health care for women, mainly for gynaecology and obstetrics, it has since expanded its role.

First, the paediatrics department was added for the care of the babies after delivery, but over the years it expanded into a full paediatric service, treating younger patients for all kinds of illnesses up to teenage. An offshoot, the neonatology service, was then added. Thus the expanded role of the hospital warranted a renaming to KK Women's and Children's Hospital.

On 1 October 1924, KKH was converted to a maternity hospital with 30 beds. It was also used to train students in midwifery and medicine.

During World War II, KKH became an emergency general hospital for the population when Japan attacked Singapore. During the Japanese occupation of Singapore, the hospital was called Chuo Byoin or Central Hospital.

In 1966, the hospital entered the Guinness Book of Records for delivering the highest number of newborns within a single maternity facility for that year, and it continued to hold on to this record for a full decade, delivering 85% of the population.

In March 1997, the hospital moved to its present site.

As a result of a restructuring exercise in the local healthcare scene, the hospital became a member of the Singapore Health Services on 1 April 2000.

In 2003, the old premises was marked as a historical site by the National Heritage Board, a tribute to an institution that has been the birthplace of over 1.2 million Singaporeans since its inception.

References

External links

KK Women's and Children's Hospital
3D KK Women's and Children's Hospital Guide

Hospitals established in 1924
Hospitals in Singapore
Hospital buildings completed in 1997
Kallang
Women's hospitals
United Arab Emirates Health Foundation Prize laureates
20th-century architecture in Singapore